Muhd Fadhil bin Nuruddin is a Malaysian politician who served as  Member of the Perak State Legislative Assembly (MLA) for Kamunting from May 2018 to November 2022. He is a member of the National Trust Party (AMANAH), a component party of the Pakatan Harapan (PH) coalition.

Education 
He had studied in SK Methodist, SMK King Edward VII and Technical Institution Penang. He is a Bachelor in Civil Engineering, Master in Science and PhD in Concrete Technology.

Early career 
He was a professor of Civil Engineering in UiTM and UTP and was the Dean of Engineering Faculty. He was also a site engineer working for Peremba-Shimidzu Sdn Bhd in 1984.

Politics 
He is currently a Member of the AMANAH Perak Political Bureau, Chairman of AMANAH Perak Culture and Arts Bureau and AJK Biro, Chief of AMANAH Bukit Jana branch and Deputy Chief of AMANAH Taiping Division. He was also the Chairman of AMANAH National Integrity Bureau.

Election result

External links

References 

Malaysian Muslims
People from Perak
University of Malaya alumni
Alumni of the University of Dundee
Universiti Sains Malaysia alumni
National Trust Party (Malaysia) politicians
Members of the Perak State Legislative Assembly
Malaysian people of Malay descent
Living people
1959 births